Clear Branch is a stream in Platte County in the U.S. state of Missouri. It is a tributary of the Platte River.

Clear Branch was so named on account of its clear water.

See also
List of rivers of Missouri

References

Rivers of Platte County, Missouri
Rivers of Missouri